Tywardreath and Par is a civil parish in Cornwall, England, United Kingdom. The 2001 UK census recorded that 3,161 people resided in the parish. This increased to 3,192 at the 2011 census.

The parish takes its name from its principal villages, Tywardreath and the china clay port of Par.

The A390, a primary route, crosses the Northern boundary of the parish at a point 200 m North of Higher Caruggatt.
The Cornish Main Line Railway enters the Parish, from the East, at a point 50m N.E. of Little Treverran, it exits the Parish as it crosses the Par River, approximately 750m South of Par Station.

See also

:Category:People from Tywardreath and Par

References

External links
 Parish Council website

Civil parishes in Cornwall